Miltochrista inflexa is a moth of the family Erebidae. It was described by Frederic Moore in 1878. It is found in the Indian states of Sikkim and Assam.

References

inflexa
Moths described in 1878
Moths of Asia